

Auberge was a restaurant in Amsterdam, Netherlands. It was a fine dining restaurant that was awarded one Michelin star in 1980 and 1981.

Head chef of Auberge was John Halvemaan.

John Halvemaan and his wife Esther (as restaurant-manager) opened the restaurant in 1976. It was closed down in 1981, due to problems with the rent.

See also
 List of Michelin starred restaurants in the Netherlands

References 

Restaurants in Amsterdam
Michelin Guide starred restaurants in the Netherlands
Defunct restaurants in the Netherlands